Altavista is an incorporated town in Campbell County, Virginia, United States. The population was 3,450 at the 2010 census. It is part of the Lynchburg Metropolitan Statistical Area.

History

A new town on a new railroad
The town of Altavista was created in 1905 during the construction of the east-west Tidewater Railway between Giles County (on the border with West Virginia) and Sewell's Point in what was at the time Norfolk County. Planned by Campbell County native William Nelson Page and financier and industrialist Henry Huttleston Rogers, the Tidewater Railway was combined with the Deepwater Railway in West Virginia to form the new Virginian Railway in 1907. Although it was a common carrier and offered limited passenger service until 1956, the main purpose of the Virginian Railway was to haul bituminous coal from the mountains to coal piers on the ice-free harbor of Hampton Roads.

Lane Brothers Construction Company was the contractor for constructing  of the Tidewater Railway, including its crossing of the existing north-south Southern Railway in Campbell County. Three Lane brothers purchased  of land near the point where the railroads would intersect, and had civil engineers lay out a new town with streets and lots, complete with water, sewer, telephone service, and electric lines. Settlement was encouraged by the awarding of free lots. Named for the Lane family farm in Albemarle County, the new town of Altavista was incorporated in 1912.

The former Virginian Railway became part of the Norfolk and Western Railway in 1959, and it and the Southern Railway were combined in the early 1980s to form the current Norfolk Southern Railway. Now operated by the same company, both railroad lines are still very active in the Altavista area.

Lane Home Furnishings

In March 1912, John Lane had purchased a bankrupt box plant in Altavista for $500. His son Ed Lane, 21 at the time and with little manufacturing experience, was encouraged by his father to try his hand at starting a chest factory in the newly acquired plant. Since the Lanes did not know how successful their new venture was going to be, they chose not to put their name on it, instead incorporating the little company as the Standard Red Cedar Chest Company, with John Lane as president and Ed Lane as vice president and general manager. From cedar chests, Lane expanded to occasional tables in 1951, case goods in 1956, and accent pieces in 1965.

In 1972, Lane bought a small reclining chair company in Tupelo, Mississippi, named Action Industries, which had been founded in 1970 by Bo Bland and Mickey Holliman. Action sustained tremendous growth through gains in market share and product diversification over the next 20 years, becoming a major force in the upholstered furniture industry. Today, the wood and upholstered divisions have become Lane Home Furnishings and a leading maker of Virginia furniture. Lane Furniture Industries was later owned by Heritage Home Group, which also owned other well-known brand name companies such as Broyhill, Thomasville, Drexel Heritage and Maitland Smith. It was purchased by United Furniture Industries.

Lane was most famous for their Lane cedar chests made at the original plant in Altavista. At the beginning of the 21st century the company headquarters were moved from Altavista and the plant there closed. Soon afterwards the last commemorative cedar chests were made as the plant shut down. The old plant now sits mostly vacant, but certain sections have become occupied by new companies, and Central Virginia Community College has moved into parts of the office building. A fire occurred in an empty section in early 2006.

Historic sites
The Avoca Museum and Altavista Downtown Historic District are listed on the National Register of Historic Places.

Government
The current Mayor of Altavista is Mike Mattox, a former teacher and local businessman; the Vice-Mayor is Reggie Bennett. There are five elected members of the Town Council.

Geography
Altavista is located in southwestern Campbell County at  (37.117622, −79.289632). It is bordered to the south by the Roanoke River, which forms the boundary with Pittsylvania County. The town of Hurt is directly to the south across the river.

U.S. Route 29, a four-lane expressway, forms the northern border of the town and provides access from four exits. US 29 leads north  to Lynchburg and south  to Danville.

Demographics

As of the census of 2000, there were 3,425 people, 1,502 households, and 940 families residing in the town. The population density was 699.9 people per square mile (270.4/km2). There were 1,650 housing units at an average density of 337.2 per square mile (130.3/km2). The racial makeup of the town was 74.25% White, 24.55% African American, 0.09% Native American, 0.20% Asian, 0.32% from other races, and 0.58% from two or more races. Hispanic or Latino of any race were 0.93% of the population.

There were 1,502 households, out of which 26.2% had children under the age of 18 living with them, 42.7% were married couples living together, 16.9% had a female householder with no husband present, and 37.4% were non-families. 34.2% of all households were made up of individuals, and 17.5% had someone living alone who was 65 years of age or older. The average household size was 2.23 and the average family size was 2.86.

In the town, the population was spread out, with 22.5% under the age of 18, 6.7% from 18 to 24, 23.7% from 25 to 44, 25.3% from 45 to 64, and 21.8% who were 65 years of age or older. The median age was 43 years. For every 100 females, there were 77.6 males. For every 100 females age 18 and over, there were 71.8 males.

The median income for a household in the town was $31,818, and the median income for a family was $40,039. Males had a median income of $32,017 versus $22,140 for females. The per capita income for the town was $17,997. About 13.6% of families and 13.5% of the population were below the poverty line, including 14.4% of those under age 18 and 16.7% of those age 65 or over.

Education
The public schools are operated by Campbell County Public Schools.

Altavista High School Team State Championships
Sports teams from Altavista High School have won several state championships in recent years.
 Boys Basketball 2015 1A, Defeated Honaker Tigers 57-44
 Football 2014 1A, Defeated Essex Trojans 22-20
 Boys Basketball 2014 1A, Defeated Radford Bobcats 49-44
 Football 2013 1A, Defeated Essex Trojans 21-0
 Boys Basketball 2013 Group A, Division 1, Defeated West Point Pointers 80-62
 Boys Cross Country 2010 Group A
 Football 2009 Group A, Division 1, Defeated J.I. Burton Raiders 27-7
 Girls Softball 2009 Group A, Defeated Glenvar Highlanders 7-1
 Girls Basketball 2004 Single A, Defeated Radford Bobcats 50-39
 Boys Basketball 2004 Single A, Defeated Riverheads 54-37
 Girls Volleyball 2002 Single A

Climate
The climate in this area is characterized by hot, humid summers and generally mild to cool winters.  According to the Köppen Climate Classification system, Altavista has a humid subtropical climate, abbreviated "Cfa" on climate maps.

References

External links

 Town website
 AVOCA Museum

Towns in Campbell County, Virginia
Towns in Virginia